Dougherty may refer to:

Schools
Dougherty Elementary School
Dougherty Valley High School

Places
In the United States
Dougherty, California
Dougherty, Georgia
Dougherty, Iowa
Dougherty, Oklahoma
Dougherty County, Georgia

Elsewhere
Dougherty (island), a phantom island near Antarctica

Other uses
Dougherty (surname), origin of the name and a list of people with the name
Dougherty (apple), an Australian apple cultivar